Anne Elizabeth Burr, later Anne Burr McDermott (June 10, 1918 - February 1, 2003), was an American actress, known especially for her work on stage and in radio.

Early life
Burr was born at Emerson Hospital in Boston, the daughter of Eugene Palmer Burr, a manager of a rooming company, and Helen Isabel Cummings. Her parents resided in Weymouth, Massachusetts at the time. Shortly after her birth, Burr's parents moved to Manhattan, where they resided on Riverside Drive. By 1930, her family had moved to Columbus, Ohio, her father's home-state. Burr had one younger brother, Charles Edward Burr (born in 1920 and died in 1938).

Career
Burr made her theatrical debut in summer stock before turning to Broadway, making her debut there in Native Son in 1941. She went on to appear in numerous Broadway productions through the 1940s, including Detective Story and The Hasty Heart.

On radio, she appeared as Regina Rawlings on Backstage Wife from 1948 until 1949; and once her character was written out of the series, she returned again in a similar role as Claudia Vincent. She routinely had roles in such serials as Big Sister, Wendy Warren and the News and When a Girl Marries. From 1951 until 1958, she was Kate Morrow on the weekly drama City Hospital, reprising the part on the television series from 1952 until 1953. She frequently appeared on Studio One with Fletcher Markle from 1947 until 1948, and from time to time performed parts on other series, such as Mr. Keen, Tracer of Lost Persons and Scotland Yard.

On television, Burr was an original cast member on the soap operas The Greatest Gift, where she played Dr. Eve Allen, one of the first female television doctors, and As the World Turns, where she originated the role of Claire English Lowell, a role she played from 1956 to 1959. Burr also had roles on The Philco Television Playhouse, Studio One, and Suspense.

Burr was briefly blacklisted during the Red Scare, but was nevertheless able to return to television soon thereafter.

In 1959, following her departure from As the World Turns, she moved to Los Angeles and retired from acting.

Personal life
Twice married, her first husband was Walter Darwin Coy (January 31, 1909 - December 11, 1974), who she married on March 26, 1942 in Manhattan. On June 21, 1953, she married her second husband Tom McDermott, a principal in Four Star Television, in Old Lyme, Connecticut.

Death
Burr died in Old Lyme, Connecticut, of respiratory failure; her husband had predeceased her in 1990. At the time of her death, she was survived by her three children from her second marriage, Maggie, Burr, and Michael, as well as five grandchildren.

References

1918 births
2003 deaths
American stage actresses
American television actresses
American radio actresses
20th-century American actresses
Actresses from Boston
21st-century American women